Vanavälja may refer to several places in Estonia:

Vanavälja, Jõgeva County, village in Palamuse Parish, Jõgeva County
Vanavälja, Viljandi County, village in Viiratsi Parish, Viljandi County